Opostega chalcoplethes is a moth of the family Opostegidae. It was described by Alfred Jefferis Turner in 1923. It is known from Western Australia.

References

Opostegidae
Moths described in 1923